Craig Redmon (born January 29, 1959) is a Republican former member of the Missouri House of Representatives. He represented the 4th District, which encompasses all of Clark, Knox, Lewis, Schuyler, and Scotland counties as well as the eastern half of Adair County east of U.S Highway 63, excluding the city of Kirksville. Most of this was previously the Missouri 1st District, also represented by Redmon, prior to Missouri House redistricting due to the 2010 U.S. Census.

Personal history
Redmon was born in Kirksville, Missouri and is a 1977 graduate of Highland High School in Lewis County. Following graduation he attended Culver-Stockton College in Canton, Missouri, receiving a degree in business administration and economics in 1982. He is married to Brenda (Shouse) Redmon and they are the parents of twins Andrew and Audrey. When not involved with his legislative duties Redmon is owner/operator of a business in Monticello, Missouri. He is also involved in local youth athletics and officiated at basketball games.

Political history

2010
Prior to running for the Missouri House, Craig Redmon served nine years on the Canton R-5 school board. Redmon defeated Neil McKee in the August, 2010 Republican Primary to advance to the General election in November. In the November election he defeated school teacher Keri Cottrell of Canton for the right to succeed Brian Munzlinger in the 1st District House seat.

2012
Redmon ran unopposed in the primary and general elections in 2012.

Legislative assignments
Craig Redmon served on the following committees:
 Appropriations – Chairman, Agriculture and Natural Resources sub-committee
 Budget
 Economic Development
 Emerging Issues in Agriculture

References

Republican Party members of the Missouri House of Representatives
1959 births
Living people
Culver–Stockton College alumni
21st-century American politicians
People from Kirksville, Missouri
People from Monticello, Missouri
People from Canton, Missouri